Bacuri is a municipality in the state of Maranhão in the Northeast region of Brazil.

Tajé (Timbirá), an extinct Jê language, was once spoken in the municipality.

See also
List of municipalities in Maranhão

References

Municipalities in Maranhão
Populated coastal places in Maranhão